Monte Carlo (or colloquially Monte-Carl ;) is officially an administrative area of the Principality of Monaco, specifically the ward of Monte Carlo/Spélugues, where the Monte Carlo Casino is located. Informally, the name also refers to a larger district, the Monte Carlo Quarter (corresponding to the former municipality of Monte Carlo), which besides Monte Carlo/Spélugues also includes the wards of La Rousse/Saint Roman, Larvotto/Bas Moulins and Saint Michel. The permanent population of the ward of Monte Carlo is about 3,500, while that of the quarter is about 15,000. Monaco has four traditional quarters. From west to east they are: Fontvieille (the newest), Monaco-Ville (the oldest), La Condamine, and Monte Carlo.

Monte Carlo is situated on a prominent escarpment at the base of the Maritime Alps along the French Riviera. Near the quarter's western end is the "world-famous Place du Casino, the gambling center ... that has made Monte Carlo an international byword for the extravagant display and reckless dispersal of wealth". It is also the location of the Hôtel de Paris, Café de Paris and Salle Garnier (the casino theatre which is the home of the Opéra de Monte-Carlo). The quarter's eastern part includes the community of Larvotto with Monaco's only public beach, as well as its new convention center (the Grimaldi Forum), and the Monte-Carlo Bay Hotel & Resort.

History

In 1856, Charles III of Monaco granted a concession to Napoleon Langlois and Albert Aubert, to establish a sea-bathing facility for the treatment of various diseases, and to build a German-style casino.

The initial casino opened in La Condamine in 1862, but was unsuccessful.  It relocated several times, before reaching its present location in the "Les Spélugues" (The Caves) area of Monte Carlo.  Success came slowly, largely because Monaco was inaccessible from much of Europe. The railway, installed in 1868, brought with it an influx of people, and Monte Carlo grew in wealth.

Saint-Charles Church on Monte Carlo's Avenue Sainte-Charles was completed in 1883. It was restored in its centenary year.

The municipality of Monte Carlo was created in 1911, when the Constitution divided the principality of Monaco into three municipalities. Monte Carlo encompassed the existing neighborhoods of La Rousse/Saint Roman, Larvotto/Bas Moulins, and Saint Michel. The municipalities merged in 1917, after accusations that the government used them to "divide and conquer".  Since then, they are wards (quartiers). Today, Monaco is divided into 10 wards, with an eleventh planned (but currently postponed) to encompass land reclaimed from the sea (see the "Administrative divisions" section of Monaco for additional details).

The quarter of Monte Carlo was served by tramways from 1898 to 1931. It linked all parts of Monaco (see transportation in Monaco). In 2003 a new cruise ship pier was completed in the harbour at Monte Carlo.

Geography 
Monte Carlo has an area of 28.14 hectares (or 0.28 square kilometers) and faces the Mediterranean Sea, bordered on the west by Moneghetti and La Condamine, on the north by Saint Michel and on the east by La Rousse and Larvotto.

Climate 
Monte Carlo has a hot-summer Mediterranean climate (Köppen climate classification: Csa), which is influenced by oceanic climate and humid subtropical climate. As a result, it has warm, dry summers and mild, rainy winters.

Sport

Monte Carlo is host to most of the Circuit de Monaco, on which the Formula One Monaco Grand Prix takes place. It also hosts world championship boxing bouts, the European Poker Tour Grand Final and the World Backgammon Championship as well as the Monaco International Auto Show (Fr: Salon International de l'Automobile de Monaco), fashion shows and other events. Although the Monte Carlo Masters tennis tournament is billed as taking place in the community, its actual location is in the adjacent French commune of Roquebrune-Cap-Martin. The Monte Carlo Rally is one of the longest running and most respected car rallies; from 1973 to 2008 and again from 2012, it marks the start of World Rally Championship season, having also served as the curtain-raiser for the Intercontinental Rally Challenge between 2009 and 2011. The rally, however, takes place outside the Monte Carlo quarter and is run mostly on French roads.

Tourism 
Monte Carlo has been visited by royalty as well as the public and movie stars for decades. Monte Carlo is one of Europe's leading tourist resorts, although many of the key tourist destinations are in other parts of Monaco, including such attractions as Monaco Cathedral, the Napoleon Museum, the Oceanographic Museum and aquarium, and the Prince's Palace, all of which are in Monaco-Ville.

Salle Garnier

The Opéra de Monte-Carlo or Salle Garnier was built to designs of the architect Charles Garnier, who also designed the Paris opera house now known as the Palais Garnier. Although much smaller, the Salle Garnier is very similar in style with decorations in red and gold, and frescoes and sculptures all around the auditorium. It was inaugurated on 25 January 1879 with a performance by Sarah Bernhardt dressed as a nymph. The first opera performed there was Robert Planquette's Le Chevalier Gaston on 8 February 1879, and that was followed by three more in the first season.

Other famous twentieth-century singers to appear at Monte Carlo included Titta Ruffo, Geraldine Farrar, Mary Garden, Tito Schipa, Beniamino Gigli, Claudia Muzio, Georges Thill, and Lily Pons.

Hôtel de Paris

The Hôtel de Paris, established in 1864 by Charles III of Monaco, is located on the west side of the Place du Casino in the heart of Monte Carlo. It belongs to the Société des bains de mer de Monaco (SBM), and is part of the elite Palace Grand Hotels in Monaco with the Hotel Hermitage, the Monte-Carlo Beach Hotel, Monte-Carlo Bay Hotel & Resort, the Hotel Metropole and Fairmont hotel.

The hotel has 106 rooms divided into four groups based on type of view, decoration and luxury. The Exclusive City View offers 20 rooms, the Superior Courtyard has 29 large rooms, the Exclusive Sea View 59 and the Exclusive Casino has six.

Additionally, there are 74 suites and junior suites which are grouped similarly, offering more luxury than the rooms. There are single and double suites as well as courtyard junior suites and Sea/Casino Junior suites. There is also one Presidential suite.

In October 2014, a renovation project began, to create a garden courtyard, add a new spa, fitness and pool area, exceptional suites, and a “rooftop villa” with a private garden and pool.

Cultural depictions

Monte Carlo has been the setting of many films, books, television shows, and video games.

Films 
 Foolish Wives (1922), although it was filmed in California.
 To Catch a Thief (1954), an Alfred Hitchcock film with Monte Carlo and its famous casino as the setting and starring Cary Grant and Grace Kelly, the future Princess Grace of Monaco.
 Grand Prix (1966), starring James Garner, Eva Marie Saint, and Yves Montand.
 Monte Carlo or Bust! (1969) also known by its American title, Those Daring Young Men in Their Jaunty Jalopie starring Tony Curtis & Terry Thomas.
 Herbie Goes to Monte Carlo (1977) starring Dean Jones & Don Knotts.
 The James Bond films Never Say Never Again (1983), and GoldenEye (1995) feature the Monte Carlo Casino.
 Once Upon a Crime (1992) The plot revolves around a series of couples in Monte Carlo, Monaco. 
 I Spy (2002)
 Iron Man 2 (2010) features the Monaco Grand Prix.
 Monte Carlo (2011)
 The DreamWorks Animation film, Madagascar 3: Europe's Most Wanted (2012), features the Monte Carlo Casino.
 A Ghost in Monte Carlo (1990), a Barbara Cartland TV movie starring Christopher Plummer, Oliver Reed, Lysette Anthony.
 Rebecca (2020), a Netflix production with Lily James, Armie Hammer and Kristin Scott Thomas as main characters.

Literature 
 Monte Carlo is featured in Edith Wharton's novel The House of Mirth (1905) as a backdrop for the leisure activities of New York's upper class in the early 20th century. 
 The first few chapters of the Gothic novel Rebecca (1938) are set in Monte Carlo.

Music 
 The Prince and Princess of Monte Carlo are characters in the Savoy opera The Grand Duke (1896) by Gilbert and Sullivan.
 Monte Carlo is an Edwardian musical comedy in two acts with a book by Sidney Carlton, music by Howard Talbot and lyrics by Harry Greenbank first performed in 1896.
 La Dame de Monte Carlo is a monologue for soprano and orchestra composed by Francis Poulenc in 1961 based on a poem from Jean Cocteau’s Théâtre de poche.
 "Monte Carlo Nights" is a song by Grover Washington Jr composed in 2001.
 "Goin' Down To Monte Carlo" is a song by Van Morrison composed in 2012.
 The Austrian musician Money Boy dedicated his song, "Monte Carlo" (2017), to Monte Carlo.

Television 
 In the British private detective series, Randall and Hopkirk (Deceased), the eleventh episode, "The Ghost who Saved the Bank at Monte Carlo" (1969), is set in Monte Carlo.
 The Bold and the Beautiful series (1987–) featured a number of episodes filmed on location in the city in 2016 and 2017. It is the location for the annual Spencer Summit.

Video games 
 The Gran Turismo series often features Monte Carlo.
 The indie game Monaco: What's Yours is Mine
 Various Formula 1 video games features the historic Circuit de Monaco
 The DiRT series features Monte Carlo as rally stages.

Twin cities
Monaco's twin cities are:

Notable residents

Alex Albon (Formula One driver)  
Victoria Azarenka (tennis player) 
Bono (singer with U2) 
Björn Borg (former tennis player) 
Jenson Button (former Formula One driver) 
Loris Capirossi (former MotoGP rider) 
Jolanda Čeplak (former athlete) 
Marin Čilić (tennis player)  
David Coulthard (former Formula One driver) 
Julian Cochran (classical composer) 
Grigor Dimitrov (tennis player) 
Novak Djokovic (tennis player) 
Richard Dunne (former professional footballer) 
Mohamed Al-Fayed (ex-Harrods owner) 
Giancarlo Fisichella (former Formula One driver) 
Matthew Goss (professional cyclist) 
Philip Green (chairman of Arcadia Group) 
Stelios Haji-Ioannou (owner of EasyJet)   
Lewis Hamilton (Formula One driver) 
Daniela Hantuchová (former tennis player) 
Justin Hayward (singer with the Moody Blues) 
Justine Henin (former tennis player) 
Markus Hipfl (former tennis player) 
Dominik Hrbatý (former tennis player) 
Jean-Raymond Boulle (businessman) 
Hubert Hurkacz (tennis player) 
Thor Hushovd (cyclist) 
Robert Kubica (Formula One driver) 
Karol Kučera (former tennis player) 
Petra Kvitová (tennis player) 
Charles Leclerc (Formula One driver) 

Gina Lollobrigida (actress) 
Felipe Massa (former Formula One driver) 
John McLaughlin (musician) 
Andriy Medvedev (former tennis player) 
Daniil Medvedev (tennis player) 
Gian Carlo Menotti (classical composer)  
Andreas Mikkelsen (WRC driver) 
Thierry Neuville (WRC driver) 
Helmut Newton (photographer)  
Lando Norris (Formula One driver) 
Mike Oldfield (musician) 
Stefano Pessina (exec chair of Alliance Boots)  
Paula Radcliffe (marathon world record holder) 
Milos Raonic (tennis player)  
Daniel Ricciardo (Formula One driver) 
Cristiano Ronaldo (footballer) 
Keke Rosberg (former Formula One driver) 
Nico Rosberg (former Formula One driver)  
Marc Rosset (former tennis player) 
Lucie Šafářová (tennis player) 
Marat Safin (former tennis player) 
David Shilling (milliner) 
 Matteo Berrettini (tennis player) 
 Jannik Sinner (born 2001) (tennis player) 
Robin Söderling (tennis player) 
Ringo Starr (drummer with the Beatles) 
Bernard Tomic (tennis player)  
Edwina Tops-Alexander (equestrian rider) 
Stoffel Vandoorne (former Formula One driver) 
Max Verstappen (Formula One driver) 
Yanina Wickmayer (tennis player) 
Jeff Wooller (accountant) 
Caroline Wozniacki (tennis player) 
Alexander Zverev (tennis player) 
Mischa Zverev (tennis player)

Gallery

See also
 Chevrolet Monte Carlo – a two-door coupé produced by Chevrolet for six generations
 Municipality of Monaco
 Monaco Heliport
 Monte Carlo method
 Monte Carlo Resort and Casino – hotel and casino in Paradise, Nevada, on the Las Vegas Strip.
 Radio Monte Carlo
 Télé Monte Carlo

References

External links

 Monte Carlo
 Monaco Portal

 
Quarters of Monaco
Cities in Monaco
France–Monaco border crossings